To the Polls, Citizens (French: Aux urnes, citoyens!) is a 1932 French comedy film directed by Jean Hémard and starring Léon Belières and Henri Poupon.

Cast

References

Bibliography 
 Crisp, Colin. Genre, Myth and Convention in the French Cinema, 1929-1939. Indiana University Press, 2002.

External links 
 

1932 films
1932 comedy films
French comedy films
1930s French-language films
Films directed by Jean Hémard
French black-and-white films
1930s French films